Valentín Oliva, professionally known as Wos (stylized in all caps), is an Argentine rapper, freestyler and actor.

Starting as a freestyler, he won the Argentine competition of freestyle battle El Quinto Escalón on several occasions, achieving national recognition. He also won the FMS Argentina and the international tournament Red Bull Batalla de Gallos, both in 2018.

Following his success in freestyle battles, he decided to pursue a musical career. In 2018, he released his first single "Púrpura" while in 2019 he released his debut studio album Caravana. He has won several Gardel Awards and received a nomination for Best New Artist at the 21st Annual Latin Grammy Awards in 2020.

Early life
Oliva's father, Alejandro Oliva is a musician and founder of the group La Bomba de Tiempo, while his mother, Maia Mónaco, is a dancer and actress who was a part of the group El Diablo en la Boca. His parents artistic influence led him to study piano and drums from a young age, he also studied acting at the Escuela Metropolitana de Arte Dramático in Buenos Aires. At 13, he was a part of the Argentine television channel Pakapaka appearing in various segments freestyling and playing the drums, during this time he started to participate in freestyle battles later inscribing himself into the competition El Quinto Escalón.

Career
At 15, he participated for the first time in the Argentine freestyler competition El Quinto Escalón, he won the competition in 2016 and was runner-up in 2017. In 2017, he competed for the first time in the Red Bull Batalla de los Gallos competition, winning the national competition but losing the international one in the final against Mexican rapper Aczino in Ciudad de México, the next year he won the international competition in Buenos Aires. In 2018, he also won the competition FMS Argentina.

After announcing his retirement from freestyle competitions, he released in 2018 his first single "Púrpura" followed by "Andrómeda", both under the label Agencia Picante with production from LOUTA and Nico Cotto. In March 2019, he performed at the music festival Lollapalooza in Argentina.

On August 9, 2019, he released "Canguro" under the label Doguito Records, being the first single for his debut album. His album Caravana was released on October 4, 2019, consisting of seven songs it was premiered in two performances on October 11 and 12 at Groove, a venue in Buenos Aires. On May 21, 2020, he released the EP Tres puntos suspensivos, recorded during the quarantines due to the COVID-19 pandemic is composed of four songs including one with his brother, Manuel.

At the 21st Annual Latin Grammy Awards in 2020, WOS received a nomination for Best New Artist. The same year, at the Gardel Awards, he won Song of the Year and Best Urban/Trap Song or Album for "Canguro" and Best New Artist for Caravana. Also in 2020, he made appearances in the comedy webseries Almost Happy and the music docuseries BREAK IT ALL: The History of Rock in Latin America, both from Netflix.

On November 4, 2020, he released "Mugre", as the first single for his upcoming second studio album and on December 17, 2020, he released "Convoy Jarana" as the album's second single. On November 18, 2021, he released his second studio album titled Oscuro éxtasis.

Discography

Studio albums
 Caravana (2019)
 Oscuro éxtasis (2021)

Extended plays
 Tres puntos suspensivos (2020)

Awards and nominations

Gardel Awards

Note: At the Gardel Awards of 2020, Facu Yalve received nominations for Record of the Year and Producer of the Year for his work in Caravana as both a producer and engineer while Martin Levi, Juan Sanchez, Stephen Thayalan and Lucila Taba won Best Cover Design as designers for Caravana. At the Gardel Awards of 2022, for their work in Oscuro Éxtasis, Javier Fracchia, Facundo Yalve and Nicolás Cotto won Best Recording Engineering, Yalve also was nominated for Producer of the Year and Alejandro Ros won Best Cover Design.

Latin Grammy Awards

References

Living people
Argentine rappers
Musicians from Buenos Aires
21st-century Argentine musicians
Argentine actors
Year of birth missing (living people)